Choi Jung-moon (born July 15, 1992) is a South Korean singer and television personality. She is a former member of the Tinus, and is a cast member in the reality show The Genius: Grand Final. She has also appeared in The Genius: Rules of the Game in 2013. She is also a member of Mensa International.

References

External links

1992 births
Living people
South Korean women pop singers
South Korean television personalities
Seoul National University alumni
Mensans
21st-century South Korean singers
21st-century South Korean women singers